Rincon High School is a public high school in Tucson, Arizona. The school serves about 1,100 students in grades 9 to 12 in the Tucson Unified School District (TUSD). Since 1985, the campus has been shared with University High School, a separate accelerated institution. Courses from each school can be combined, and athletics and fine arts are combined under the Rincon/University(RUHS) name. The two schools do field separate teams for academic competitive events. It opened its doors in 1958.

Notable alumni

 Ron Barber, U.S. Representative for Arizona (since 2012)
 Jason Jacome, Former MLB player (New York Mets, Kansas City Royals, Cleveland Indians)
 Jimmy Johnson, former minor league infielder and manager
 Dan Schneider, Major League Baseball pitcher.
 Paul Moskau, Former MLB player (Cincinnati Reds, Pittsburgh Pirates, Chicago Cubs)
 Tom Pagnozzi, Former MLB player (St. Louis Cardinals)
 Nora Slawik, Minnesota politician
 Janet Varney, actress
 Kate Walsh, actress
 Chad Griggs, professional mixed martial arts fighter

References 

Public high schools in Arizona
Educational institutions established in 1959
Schools in Tucson, Arizona
1959 establishments in Arizona